Julien Boutter (born 5 April 1974) is a former professional male tennis player from France.

Career
At the 2002 Australian Open, Boutter defeated No. 2 seed and former World No. 1 Gustavo Kuerten, despite being down two sets, 3–6, 4–6, 7–5, 6–3, 6–3.

In his career, he won one singles title (2003 Casablanca) and reached the final in Milan (2001) but lost to Swiss Roger Federer. He reached two Master Series quarterfinals at Hamburg in 2002 and Monte Carlo in 2003. Boutter also reached the semi-finals of the 2002 Australian Open partnering fellow Frenchman Arnaud Clément, only to lose to Michaël Llodra and Fabrice Santoro 3–6, 6–3, 10–12. During the match, Boutter led an impromptu funeral ceremony for a bird inadvertently hit by Llodra as it was chasing a moth.

Career finals

Singles: 2 (1–1)

Doubles: 6 (4–2)

Challengers and Futures finals

Singles: 7 (3–4)

Doubles: 5 (2–3)

References

External links
 
 

1974 births
Living people
People from Boulay-Moselle
French expatriate sportspeople in Belgium
French male tennis players
Sportspeople from Moselle (department)